Jain temples and tirtha (pilgrimage sites) are present throughout the Indian subcontinent, many of which were built several hundred years ago. Many of these temples are classified according to Jain sects. Idols of tirthankaras are present in these temples. Many Jain temples are found in other areas of the world. This article lists and documents prominent Jain temples and Tirthas around the world.

India

Andhra Pradesh

Cave temples
 Undavalli Caves
 Ambapuram cave temple
 Bodhikonda and Ghanikonda Caves
 Siddalakona

 Main temples
 Danavulapadu Jain temple
Shree Shankheshwar Parshwanath Jain temple in Gummileru
Hrinkar Teerth near NH 5, Namburu.

Assam
 Jain Temple in Tihu, Tihu
 Sri Surya Pahar

Bihar

Cave temple
 Son Bhandar Caves

Main temple
 Rajgir
 Jal Mandir, Pawapuri
 Champapuri
 Lachhuar Jain temple, Jamui district
 Kamaldah Jain temple in Pataliputra
 Vikramashila
 Jain temple, Kundalpur
 Mandargiri, Bihar
 Arrah – 44 Jain temples including Parashanatha Temple, Arrah

Chhattisgarh

 Arang Jain temples, Arang
 Kevalya Dham, Kumhari
 Uwasaggaharam Parshwa Teerth, Durg

Daman and Diu

Jain Temple, Daman Fort

Delhi

 Sri Digambar Jain Lal Mandir
 Naya Mandir, Dharampura
 Ahinsa Sthal, Mehrauli
 Shri Atma Vallabh Jain Smarak
 Dādābadī, Mehrauli

Goa
 Neminath Jain Basti at Bandivade
 Cudnem Jain Temple
 Narve Jain Temple Ruins

Gujarat

Cave temple
 Bava Pyara Caves
 Dhank Caves
 Talaja Caves

Main temple
 Palitana Tirtha, most visited Jain temple in Gujarat
 Shri Shankeshwar Tirth
 Girnar Jain temples
 Taranga Jain temple
 Hutheesing Jain Temple
 Vasai Jain Temple in Bhadresar
 Mahudi Jain Temple
 Shantinath Jain temple in Kothara, Kutch
 Kumbharia Jain temples
 Panchasara Parshwanath temple, Patan
 Songadh Tirtha – main tirth for Kanji Panth
 Vataman
 Jain temples, Abhapur
 Trimandir, Adalaj in Gandhinagar
 Shri Pavagadh Tirth
 Naliya Jain Derasar
 Simandhar Swami Jain Derasar in Mehsana
 Pallaviya Parshwanath Temple in Palanpur
 Vardhman Shah's Temple and Shantinath Mandir in Jamnagar
 Chintamani Jain Temple in Surat
 Shri Talaja Tirth
 Simandhar Swami Jain Derasar in Bhilad
 Vijapur Derasar in Vijapur
 Chandaprabhu Digambar Jain Bavan Jinalya, Bhiloda
 Rajgadhi Timbo
 Trimandir, Godhra in Godhra
 Shri Suthri Jain Derasar, Suthari
 Jain Derasar of Tera, Kutch
 Jain temples in Ghogha
 Pushpagiri, Sonkatch

Haryana

 Ranila Jain temple
 Punyoday Tirth

Himachal Pradesh 

 Ambika mata temple, Kangra fort
 Kangra Shwetambar Jain temple

Jharkhand

Shri Sammed Shikharji

Karnataka

 Cave temples
 Badami cave temples in Badami
 Aihole cave temple

 Main temples
 Shravanabelagola, a monumental Gommateshwara statue (Bahubali) in Hassan district. 27 Basadi complex including Akkana Basadi, Odegal basadi, Parshvanatha basadi, Chandragupta basadi, Bhandara Basadi and Chavundaraya Basadi
 Karkala, 1. Hiriyangadi Basadi 2. Chathurmukha Basadi 3. Padmavathi Kere Basadi. The famous monolithic  Gommateshwara statue the second tallest in Karnataka is also here.
 Dharmasthala, a  Gomateshwara idol.
 Venur, a  Gomateshwara idol.
 Gommatagiri, a  Gomateshwara idol.
 Moodabidri, 18 ancient Jain temple including Saavira Kambada Basadi the Thousand Pillars Temple and Guru Basadi 
 Brahma Jinalaya in Lakkundi
 Humcha Jain temples
 Navagraha Jain Temple in Hubli
 Sankighatta
 Jain Narayana temple, Pattadakal
 Kundadri : It is said this is Samadhi sthal of Acharya Kundakunda
 Chaturmukha Basadi in Karkala
 Basadi complex, Halebidu : 1. Parshvanatha Basadi 2. Shantinatha Basadi 3. Adinatha Basadi
 Varanga – This is an important Jain centre. The Kere basadi is located in midst of a lake. There are many other basadis too.
 Aihole Jain complex – Meguti Jain temple, Charanthimatha Group of temples, Yoginarayana group and Jain cave temple
 Kanakagiri Jain tirth
 Shanka Basadi and Ananthanatha basadi at Lakshmeshwara
 Shantinatha Basadi, Jinanathapura
 Panchakuta Basadi, Kambadahalli
 Hadavalli Jain Temple
 Jwalamalini temple, Narasimharajapura
 Kamal Basadi and Chikki Basadi at Belgaum Fort
 Chaturmukha Basadi, Gerusoppa
 Mandaragiri
 Jain Bhattaraka Math at Manyakheta
 Aagam Mandir, Tumkur
 Kamthana Jain temple
 Shri 1008 Adinath Digamber Jin Mandir, Jayanagar, Bangalore
 Shri Mahavira Digambara Jain temple, Chickpet
 Kalya (Kalyana pura)
 Gundwad Jain Basadi
 Kathale Basadi, Barkur
 Sri Parshwanath Swamy Basadi
 Jain temple inside Hangal Fort, Hubli
 Hampi Jain complex
 Padmabbarasi basadi, Naregal
 Shantinatha Basadi, Kalaghatagi
 Godageri 
 Sargur
 Shri Parshwa Sushil Dham, Attibele

Kerala

 Anantnath Swami Temple
 Jain temple, Alleppey
 Jainimedu Jain temple, Palakkad.
 Kallil Temple in Angamaly, Ernakulam.
 Kattil Madam Temple
 Sultan Bathery Jain Temple, Wayanad
 Dharmanath Jains Temple at Mattancherry, Kochi
 Chathurmukha Basati and Parswanatha Basati, Manjeshwar

Madhya Pradesh

Caves
 Siddhachal Caves of Gwalior Fort is home to dozens of historical large size Jain rock-cut sculptures.
 Gopachal Hill
 Udayagiri Caves

Temples
 Kundalpur – including Bade Baba Temple
 Jain temples of Khajuraho – Parshvanatha temple, Adinatha temple, Shantinatha temple, and Ghantai temple
 Sonagiri
 Muktagiri
 Hanumantal Bada Jain Mandir, Jabalpur
 Bawangaja
 Kanch Mandir in Indore
 Jain temples, Vidisha – Pataria Jain temples, Bajramath temple, Maladevi temple, Gadarmal Devi Temple, Bada Mandir
 Pataini temple
 Paporaji
 Pateriaji
 Bandhaji
 Mohankheda Tirth, Dhar
 Aharji Jain Teerth
 Nainagiri
 Ajaigarh
 Sarvodaya Jain temple, Amarkantak
 Pisanhari ki Marhia
 Pavagiri Tirth and Chaubara Dera, Oon, Khargone
 Semliya
 Digambar Jain Siddhakshetra, Falhodi Badagaon
 Parasli Tirth, Mandsaur
 Jain temple complex, Chanderi – Choubeesee Bara Mandir, Khandargiri Jain cave, Thobonji Jain temple, Chandraprabha Digambar Jain temple
 Shree Vimalnath Bhagwan Tirth in Dhule
 Mahavir Jain Temple and Digambar Jain Parasnath Jinalaya, Bhind
 Bahuriband
 Sri Mandavgadh Jain Tirth, Mandu, Madhya Pradesh
 Dayasagar Ji Mararaj Nemingar Jain Tirth, Sagar
 Sihoniya Ambikā Devī Temple, Morena
 Maksi
 Bhojpur Jain Temple
 Temples in Jalore Fort
 Shri Adinath Keshwarna Jain Temple
 Gommat Giri, Indore

Maharashtra

 Cave temple
 Ellora Jain Caves
 Nasik Caves
 Manmodi Caves
 Mangi-Tungi

 Main temple
 Shantinath Jain Teerth
 Gajpanth
 Kumbhoj
 Jintur
 Godiji
 Nemgiri
 Katraj Tirth
 Babu Amichand Panalal Adishwarji Jain Temple, Walkeshwar
 Shantinatha temple, Ramtek
 Shree Vimalnath Bhagwan Tirth, Sakri
 Shri Antariksha Parshvanath, Pavali Digambar Jain Mandir, Vighnahara Prshvatnath Shvetambar Mandir and Chintamani Parshvanath Mandir in Nashik
 Pashvanath Jain Temple, Nijampur Dhule
 Paithan Jain Tirth
 Karanja Jain temple
 Shri Digamber Jain Siddha Kshetra Kunthalgiri
 Trimurti Digambar Jain Mandir
 Shree Mahavir Jain Temple in Pimpri-Chinchwad
 Shri vimalnatha swami Jain shwetambar temple
 Kachner Jain temple
 Dahigaon

Nagaland

 Dimapur Jain Temple, Dimapur
 Jain Temple Kohima, Kohima

Odisha

Cave temple
 Udayagiri and Khandagiri Caves, Bhubaneswar: 2nd century BCE

Main temple
 Digambara Jaina Temple, Khandagiri
 Parsvanath Jain Temple-I and Parsvanath Jain Temple-II, Khandagiri hill
 Subai Jain temples: 4th century CE
 Jaugada, Ganjam
 Digambara Jain Temple, Rourkela

Rajasthan

 Ranakpur Jain Temple, Ranakpur
 Dilwara Temples, Mount Abu
 Mirpur Jain Temple, Sirohi
 Shri Mahavirji, Karauli
 Sanghiji, Sanganer
 Soniji Ki Nasiyan (Ajmer Jain Temple)
 Nareli Jain Temple
 Kesariyaji Tirth, Rishabhdeo
 Tijara Jain Temple, Alwar
 Mahavira Jain temple, Osian
 Lodhurva Jain temple
 Nakodaji
 Bhandasar Jain Temple in Bikaner
 Kirti Stambh in Chittor Fort
 Jain Temples in Kumbhalgarh Fort
 Bijolia Parshvanath temple
 Andeshwar Parshwanath
 Jaisalmer Fort Jain temples
 Muchhal Mahavir Temple
 Chand Khedi, Jhalawar
 Naugaza Digambar Jain temple
 Padampura, Jaipur
 Shree Pavapuri Tirth Dham, Sirohi district
 Jirawala
 Chamatkarji
 Ladnun
 Atishaya Kshetra Lunwa Jain Temple at Nagaur district
 Nageshwar Parshwanath Tirth
 Jahaj Mandir, Mandwala
 Bhandavapur
 Mungathala
 Atishykari Shri 1008 Munisuvratnath Jain Mandir, Jahazpur
 Nanaji Jain temple
 Kanor Adeshware Ji
 Bhinmal Bhaya-Bhanjan Parshvanath Temple
 Swaran Jain temple, Falna
 Rata Mahaveerji
 Shri Navlakha Parshwanath Jain Temple, Pali, Rajasthan
 Jain temples in Tonk dist.
 Jain temples in Jalore
 Jain Temple in Bishangarh
 Shantinath Jain Temple, Jhalawar
 Keshoraipatan Jain temple
 Sanderao Jain Temple
 Khimel Jain Temple
 Shri Narlia Teerth
 Pindwara
 Ranoli
 Choolgiri, Jaipur

Telangana
 Cave temple
 Bommalagutta cave temple and Tribhuvanatilaka Basadi

 Main temple
 Kulpakji
 Shri Vighn-harneshvar Parshva Digambara Jain Atishaya Kshetra in Kulcharam

Tamil Nadu

 Cave temples
 Tirumalai (Jain complex)
 Kalugumalai Jain Beds
 Thirakoil
 Samanar Hills
 Sittanavasal Cave : 2nd century BCE
 Thirakoil, Thiruvannamalai
 Vallimalai Jain caves
 Thirupparankundram Rock-cut Cave and Inscription
 Kurathimalai, Onampakkam
 Panchapandavar Malai
 Seeyamangalam
 Kanchiyur Jain cave and stone beds
 Ennayira Malai
 Andimalai Stone beds, Cholapandiyapuram
 Adukkankal, Nehanurpatti
 Kalugumalai Jain Beds
 Kanchiyur Jain cave and stone beds

 Main temples
 Arahanthgiri Jain Math, Thiruvannamalai
 Alagramam Jain Temple
 Chitharal malaikovil : 1st century BCE
 Gingee, Viluppuram
 Karanthai Jain Temple
 Mannargudi Mallinatha Swamy Jain Temple, Nagapattinam
 Mel Sithamur Jain Math, Villupuram
 Poondi Arugar Temple
 Ponnur Hills, Thiruvannamalai
 Sittanavasal, Pudukottai
 Trilokyanatha Temple, Kanchipuram
 Vijayamangalam Jain temple
 Adisvaraswamy Jain Temple, Thanjavur 
 Chandraprabha Jain Temple, Kumbakonam
 Deepanayakaswamy Jain Temple, Deepankudi
 Parshvantha temple, Sowcarpet

Uttar Pradesh

 Shantinath Temple, Deogarh
 Prachin Bada Mandir, Jambudweep, Kailash Parvat Rachna, Ashtapad Teerth in Hastinapur, Meerut
 Navagarh Tirth
 Ahi Kshetra
 Vahelna Jain temple, Vahelna
 Trilok Teerth Dham, Bada Gaon in Baghpat
 Parshvanath Jain temple in Varanasi
 Sarnath Jain Tirth at Sarnath, Varanasi
 Shobhnath temple, Shravasti
 Shri Shouripur Digambar Jain Siddha Kshetra, Bateshwar
 Shri Vimalnath Digambar Jain Atishay Kshetra in Kampil, Farrukhabad district
 Shree Parsvnath Atishey Kshetra Digamber Jain mandir, Bada Gaon in Baghpat
 Shri Chintamani Parshwnath Jain Shwetambar Mandir, Haridwar
 Shri 1008 digamabar Adinath Jain mandir, Raiganj
 Khukhundoo
 Teerthdham Mangalayatan Mandir

Uttarakhand

 Shri Adinath Digambar Jain Mandir, New Tehri
 1008 Shri Rishabhdev Jain Mandir, Shrinagar

West Bengal
 
 Calcutta Jain Temple
 Pakbirra Jain temples
 Kathgola Adinath Temple
 Shree Digambar Jain Pareswanath Temple, Belgachia
 Sat Deul
 Harmasra Jain temple

Outside India
There are a number of Jain temples in various countries outside India.

Australia
 Jain Temple, Melbourne – 124-126 Rowans Rd, Moorabbin, Victoria 3189 – Melbourne Shwetambar Jain Sangh (MSJS)
 Jain Temple, Sydney – Seven Hill Sydney Jain Mandal
 Jain Temple, Sydney – 139 Gilba Rd, Girraween NSW 2145 Vitraag Jain Shwetambar Sangh

Belgium
 Jain temple, Antwerp in Wilrijk, Belgium

Canada

 Brampton Jain Temple
 The Jain Society of Toronto has a Swethambar/Digambar temple in Toronto
 Digambar Temple Shri Jain Mandir in Toronto

Hong Kong
 Shree Hong Kong Jain Sangh, Tsim Sha Tsui, Hong Kong

Japan

 Kobe, Japan

Kenya
 Mombasa Jain temple
 Nairobi Jain temple
 Thika
 Nakuru

Malaysia
 Ipoh, Perak
 "First Shikhar Bandhi Jain Deraser" dedicated to Shri Chintamani Parshvanath Bhagawan, Mata Padamavati Devi & Mataji Sarasvati Devi in Ipoh
 Kualalumpur Swetamber Jain Temple – Bangsar

Myanmar 

  Shree Jain Shwetamber Murtipujak Temple, 29th Street Yangon

Nepal

 Jain Temple, Kathmandu Near Kamal Pokhari Bus Stop, Kathmandu (Nepal)

Pakistan

Punjab

 Jain Shwetambar Temple with Shikhar, Thari Bhabrian Lahore City.
 Jain Digambar Temple with Shikhar, Thari Bhabrian Lahore City.
 Jain Shwetambar Dada Wadi (Mini Temple), Guru Mangat in Lahore Cantt., footprints in stone.
 Jain Digambar Temple with Shikhar, Old Anarkali Jain Mandir Chawk: This temple was destroyed in the riots of 1992. Now an Islamic school is run in the former temple.
Digmabar Jain temple Thar, Pakistan.
 Jain Digambar Temple Bohar Gate Multan

Sindh

 Nagarparkar Jain Temples
 Gori Temple, Nagarparkar, original site of Godiji Parshwanath
 Jain Shwetamber Temple with Shikhar, Ranchod Line, Karachi
 Jain Shwetamber Temple, Hyderabad

Singapore
 Jain Temple 18 Jalan Yasin, Singapore

Tanzania
 Shree Jain Sangh in Dar es Salaam, Tanzania
 Jain Derasar in Arusha, Tanzania 
 Zanzibar Derasar in Zanzibar, Tanzania

United Arab Emirates
 Jain temple, Dubai

United Kingdom

 Shree Mahavir Swami Jain Temple, Harrow, London
 Oshwal Mahajanwadi, Croydon
 Jain Samaj Manchester
 Jain Samaj Leicester and Temple
 Jain Samaj Wellingborough and temple
 Jain Samaj Thornton Heath (Croydon)
 Jain Samaj Potters Bar – Jain temple and community centre
 Kailash Giri Jain temple, London
 Oshwal Centre, Hertfordshire.  First on virgin ground in Europe.
 Shrimad Rajchandra Mission Dharampur London Spiritual Centre. (Bushey)
Institute of Jainology at Greenford, London.

United States

 St. Louis Jain temple
 Siddhachalam, New Jersey, USA
 Jain Center of America
 Jain Center of Greater Phoenix
 Jain Center of Southern California, Buena Park, CA
 Siddhayatan
 Jain Society of San Diego, Vista CA
 Jain center of Northern California, Milpitas, CA
 Jain Sangh of New England, Burlington, MA
 Jain Society of Chicago, Illinois
 Jain Society of Greater Atlanta
 Redmond Jain Derasar, Redmond, Washington
 Jain Society of Seattle
 Jain Society of Greater Cleveland
 Hindu Jain temple in Monroeville, Pennsylvania
 Jain religion center of Wisconsin
 Jain Temple of Greater Detroit – Farmington Hills, Michigan USA
 Franklin Township Derasar, New Jersey
 Jain Society of Metropolitan Chicago
 Jain Temple of Pennsauken Township (Cherry Hill), NJ

See also

 Jain Temple
 Tirthankara
 List of largest Jain temples

References

External links

List of Jain temples in India

Temples
Lists of religious buildings and structures
Temples